Notiophilus palustris is a genus of ground beetle native to the Palearctic and the Nearctic.

In Europe, it is found in Austria, Belarus, Belgium, Bosnia and Herzegovina, Great Britain including the Isle of Man, Bulgaria, the Czech Republic, mainland Denmark, Estonia, Finland, mainland France, Germany, Hungary, the mainland Italy, Kaliningrad, Latvia, Liechtenstein, Lithuania, Luxembourg, Moldova, North Macedonia, mainland Norway, Poland, Russia, Slovakia, Slovenia, mainland Spain, Sweden, Switzerland, the Netherlands, Ukraine and Yugoslavia.

References

Nebriinae
Beetles described in 1812